|}

The Coronation Cup is a Group 1 flat horse race in Great Britain open to horses aged four years or older. It is run at Epsom Downs over a distance of 1 mile, 4 furlongs and 6 yards (2,420 metres), and it is scheduled to take place each year in late May or early June.

History
The event was established in 1902 to commemorate the coronation of a new British monarch, King Edward VII. Epsom had staged a similar race, the Epsom Gold Cup, which was open to horses aged three or older. The Coronation Cup was temporarily switched to alternative venues during wartime periods, with runnings at Newmarket (1915–16, 1943–45) and Newbury (1941).

The race is contested on the first day of Epsom's two-day Derby Festival meeting, the same day as the Epsom Oaks. Its distance is the same as that of both the Oaks and the Epsom Derby, and it often features horses who competed in those events in the preceding seasons.

Records
Most successful horse (3 wins):
 St Nicholas Abbey – 2011, 2012, 2013

Leading jockey (9 wins):
 Lester Piggott – Zucchero (1953), Nagami (1959), Petite Etoile (1960, 1961), Park Top (1969), Roberto (1973), Quiet Fling (1976), Sea Chimes (1980), Be My Native (1983)

Leading trainer (8 wins):
 Aidan O'Brien – Yeats (2005), Scorpion (2007), Soldier of Fortune (2008), Fame and Glory (2010), St Nicholas Abbey (2011, 2012, 2013), Highland Reel (2017)

Leading owner (8 wins): (includes part ownership)
 Sue Magnier – Yeats (2005), Scorpion (2007), Soldier of Fortune (2008), Fame and Glory (2010), St Nicholas Abbey (2011, 2012, 2013), Highland Reel (2017)

Winners

See also
 Horse racing in Great Britain
 List of British flat horse races

References

 Paris-Turf:
 Racing Post:

 galopp-sieger.de – Coronation Cup (ex Epsom Gold Cup).
 ifhaonline.org – International Federation of Horseracing Authorities – Coronation Cup (2019).
 pedigreequery.com – Coronation Cup – Epsom.
 
 YouTube Race Videos https://www.youtube.com/playlist?list=PLfn5x2SD03q4-sn0-N2vkJhF8SOHQjawg

Flat races in Great Britain
Epsom Downs Racecourse
Open middle distance horse races
Recurring sporting events established in 1902
1902 establishments in England
British Champions Series